David Malcolm Trustram Eve, 2nd Baron Silsoe QC, (2 May 1930 – 31 December 2005), who was known as David Silsoe, was a prominent British lawyer who succeeded to the title of Baron Silsoe in 1976 on the death of his father, Malcolm Eve, 1st Baron Silsoe.  He assumed the familial title on succession; prior to that he was known by his family name, Trustram Eve.

Educated at Elm Park Preparatory School, County Armagh, Sandroyd School, Winchester College and Christ Church, Oxford, he was called to the Bar in 1955.  In 1963 he married Bridget Min Hart-Davis, daughter of Sir Rupert Hart-Davis and sister of Duff Hart-Davis and  Adam Hart-Davis.  He took silk in 1972.

Silsoe deliberately followed a career in planning law, his favoured area, rather than spending his life in law courts ("wig and gown" as he described it), an environment he did not particularly enjoy.  He was leading counsel for the proposers in notable public inquiries beginning with the Thorp nuclear fuel reprocessing plant and finishing with the Heathrow airport Terminal 5 expansion inquiry.  Between the two he appeared in those for Heathrow Terminal 4, Gatwick North Terminal and Sizewell B and Hinkley Point C nuclear power stations.

Silsoe lived near Reading, Berkshire and was an active member of the congregation at All Saints Church, Rotherfield Peppard, serving for some years on the Parochial Church Council.  He was instrumental in shaping the revised Henley deanery in the late 1990s.

Lord Silsoe died in Reading, aged 75; he was succeeded by Simon Rupert Trustram Eve, 3rd Baron Silsoe.

References

External links
obituary in The Independent
Photos and other material

1930 births
2005 deaths
Barons in the Peerage of the United Kingdom
Members of the Inner Temple
People educated at Sandroyd School
People educated at Winchester College
British twins
20th-century English lawyers
English King's Counsel
20th-century King's Counsel
21st-century King's Counsel
Alumni of Christ Church, Oxford
Silsoe